Traveller's Samples is a 1951 short story collection by Frank O'Connor. It features the following stories:
First Confession
The Man of the House
The Idealist
The Drunkard
The Thief (alternate title: Christmas Morning)
My First Protestant
This Mortal Coil
Old Age Pensioners
Legal Aid
The Masculine Principle
The Sentry
Jerome
The Lady of the Sagas
Darcy in the Land of Youth

References

1951 short story collections
Short story collections by Frank O'Connor
Works by Frank O'Connor